The Noah Conspiracy is a 1981 novel by American writer Michael Shaara, first published as The Herald.

It is a science fiction story about the fate of mankind, in which millions are dying, and one man must choose between saving mankind or saving the future. It takes its name from the Biblical character of Noah, who entered an ark to save himself and his family.

1981 American novels
1981 science fiction novels
American science fiction novels
Novels by Michael Shaara